Crinipes is a genus of plants in the Poaceae−grass family native to central Africa.

Species
Species of Crinipes include:
 Crinipes abyssinicus  (Hochst. ex A. Braun) Hochst. — endemic to Ethiopia
 Crinipes longifolius C.E.Hubb. — native to Ethiopia, South Sudan, and Uganda

Former species
Species formerly classified within Crinipes include:
 Crinipes gynoglossa — Styppeiochloa gynoglossa.
 Crinipes longipes — Nematopoa longipes.

References

Molinieae
Bunchgrasses of Africa
Flora of Ethiopia
Flora of South Sudan
Flora of Uganda
Poaceae genera